Olgiate Molgora is a comune (municipality) in the Province of Lecco in the Italian region Lombardy, located about  northeast of Milan and about  south of Lecco.

The municipality of Olgiate Molgora contains the frazioni (subdivisions, mainly villages and hamlets) Olgiate Vecchio, Buttero, Mondonico, Porchera, S.Zeno, Beolco, Monticello, Pianezzo, Monastirolo, Canova, Regondino, and Olcellera.

Olgiate Molgora borders the following municipalities: Airuno, Brivio, Calco, Colle Brianza, Merate, Montevecchia, Rovagnate, Santa Maria Hoè. It is served by Olgiate-Calco-Brivio railway station, which is a part of the Milan S Lines (S8), the commuter rail system serving the metropolitan area of Milan.

Demographic evolution

References

External links
 www.comune.olgiatemolgora.lc.it

Cities and towns in Lombardy